Jean Adrien François Lecanuet (4 March 1920 – 22 February 1993) was a French centrist politician.

Biography 
Lecanuet was born to a family of modest means in Neuilly-sur-Seine, and gravitated towards philosophy studies. He received his diploma at the age of 22, becoming the youngest agrégé ("A+" professor) in France. He participated in the Second World War French Resistance movement. In August 1944, he was arrested along with a commando that had just blown up the Lille-Brussels railroad, but he managed to escape with the help of a Pole who had been drafted into the German army. He then married Denise Paillard with whom he had three children.

After the Liberation, he became a general inspector at the Ministry of Defence.

Under the Fourth Republic, Lecanuet held ministerial posts numerous times (11 posts in 10 years) and was a member of the Christian-Democratic Popular Republican Movement (MRP). From 1951 to 1955, he was MRP deputy from the Seine-Inférieure region. He became senator from Seine-Maritime in 1959 and was president of the MRP from 1963 to 1965.

In 1965, he ran in the presidential election as a center-right candidate. He was supported by Paul Reynaud. He advocated modernity and European integration and declared to represent a third way between Gaullism on the one hand and the Socialist and Communist Left on the other hand. His "modern-style" campaign and dashing smile had some journalists nickname him "the French Kennedy". Lecanuet obtained 3,777,120 votes (15.6%) in the election's first round, forcing Charles de Gaulle to compete in a second round against François Mitterrand. He replaced the ageing MRP by the Democratic Centre, integrating the liberal-conservative National Centre of Independents and Peasants.

In 1972, Lecanuet founded the Reforming Movement with Jean-Jacques Servan-Schreiber. During the French legislative elections of 1973, Lecanuet negotiated the withdrawal of candidates with Pierre Messmer to ensure the success of the majority. He was elected deputy of Seine-Maritime and actively participated in the 1974 presidential election campaign in support of Valéry Giscard d'Estaing.

Lecanuet was Minister of Justice in Jacques Chirac's first cabinet (1974–1976). From 1976 to 1977, he was Minister of State in charge of planning and the l’Aménagement du territoire (zoning commission) Raymond Barre's first cabinet. In 1978, he was elected president of the UDF, the party coalition created to support President Valéry Giscard d'Estaing. He held that position until 1988. From 1979 to 1988, he was a Deputy in the European Parliament and, as Senator for Seine-Maritime, the French Senate's chairman of the Foreign Affairs and Armed Forces Commission, a post that he had already held between 1971 and 1973.

In 1986 at the beginning of the first period of "cohabitation" in modern French politics (a President and Prime Minister from opposing parties sharing power) Chirac nominated Lecanuet as Foreign Minister, but President François Mitterrand vetoed the appointment, along with some of Chirac's other nominees.

In 1968, he was elected Mayor of Rouen, a position he held for 23 years until his death.

He dies of cancer on the 22nd of February 1993.

References

Sources 
 Chaline (Nadine-Josette), Jean Lecanuet, Beauchesne, Paris, 2000.
 Priol (Philippe), Jean Lecanuet, le vol de l’albatros, Maître Jacques, Caen, 2001.

|-

|-

1920 births
1993 deaths
Politicians from Rouen
Popular Republican Movement politicians
Democratic Centre (France) politicians
Reformist Movement (France) politicians
Union for French Democracy politicians
French Ministers of Justice
Deputies of the 2nd National Assembly of the French Fourth Republic
French Senators of the Fifth Republic
Senators of Seine-Maritime
Deputies of the 5th National Assembly of the French Fifth Republic
Deputies of the 8th National Assembly of the French Fifth Republic
Candidates for President of France
Lycée Pierre-Corneille alumni
French Resistance members
French Righteous Among the Nations